Team Scandia was a team in the Indy Racing League owned by Andy Evans that fielded a record 7 cars in the 1996 Indianapolis 500. Evans bought the team from Dick Simon during the 1996 season and Simon was listed as the owners of some of Scandia's cars in the 1996 "500". The team tried to achieve a similar feat with five cars in the 1997 Indy 500, but with higher expenses brought by new chassis, the venture was less successful. Later that season, the team captured its only IRL victory with a car driven by Eliseo Salazar at Las Vegas Motor Speedway. The team shut down in 1999 due to lack of sponsorship after scaling back heavily from 1998 onwards.

Team Scandia drivers
  Michele Alboreto (1996-1997)
  Racin Gardner (1996)
  Affonso Giaffone (1997)
  Marco Greco (1997)
  Stephan Gregoire (1997)
  Joe Gosek (1996)
  Jim Guthrie (1999)
  Michel Jourdain Jr. (1996-1997)
  Jimmy Kite (1997-1998)
  Billy Roe (1998)
  Eliseo Salazar (1996-1997)
  Vincenzo Sospiri (1997)
  Lyn St. James (1996)
  Fermín Vélez (1996-1997)
  Alessandro Zampedri (1996-1997)

IRL Race Results
(key) (Results in bold indicate pole position; results in italics indicate fastest lap)

IndyCar win

IndyCar Series teams
American auto racing teams

24 Hours of Le Mans teams